Frank Miotke (born December 22, 1965) is a former American football wide receiver. He played for the Houston Oilers in 1991.

Franks currently plays men's league hockey in the BLH at The Pond Arena in Chagrin Falls Ohio.  He is a member of The Swayzees Hockey Club, playing forward and wearing jersey #19.

References

1965 births
Living people
American football wide receivers
Grand Valley State Lakers football players
New York Giants players
Houston Oilers players